Konursu is a village in the Bayburt District, Bayburt Province, Turkey. Its population is 1,093 (2021). Before the 2013 reorganisation, it was a town (belde).

References

Villages in Bayburt District